Comet Kopff or 22P/Kopff is a periodic comet in the Solar System. Discovered on August 23, 1906, it was named after August Kopff who discovered the comet. The comet was missed on its November 1912 return, but was recovered on its June 1919 return and has been seen at every apparition since. Close approaches to Jupiter in 1938 and 1943 decreased the perihelion distance and orbital period. 22P/Kopff’s last perihelion passage was 18 March 2022. On 13 July 2028 it will pass  from Earth.

Observations

22P/Kopff was discovered at Königstuhl Observatory on Heidelberg, Germany. Kopff analyzed photographic plates which he exposed on August 20, 1903, against pre-discovery images of the same region. On August 23, 1903, Kopff concluded it to be a comet with an estimated apparent magnitude of 11. On mid-September 1906, the short-period nature of the comet was recognized by a team headed by Kiel Ebell of the Berkeley Astronomical Department. The comet was missed when it made a return on November 25, 1912, however on June 25, 1919, astronomers recovered the comet. The comet was located less than three days from the predicted position. Over the next several returns to Earth, none were notable until the 1945 comet’s return when the comet peaked at magnitude 8.5. The increase in brightness was a result of Jupiter altering the comet’s orbit between the years of 1939 to 1945. This change in orbit brought the comet closer to the Sun. The 1951 return was unique due to the comet being 3 magnitudes fainter than what was expected when recovered in April 1951. But the comet still reached magnitude 10.5 in October 1951. A very close pass to Jupiter in 1954 increased the comet’s perihelion distance to 1.52 AU and increased the orbital period to 6.31 years. On November 30, 1994, Carl W. Hergenrother was able to recover the comet at a stellar magnitude of 22.8 using the 1.5-m reflector at the Catalina Sky Survey. The comet reached magnitude 7 during the 1996 perihelion passage.

The comet nucleus is estimated to be 3.0 kilometers in diameter with an albedo of 0.05. The nucleus is dark because hydrocarbons on the surface have been converted to a dark, tarry like substance by solar ultraviolet radiation.

References

External links 
 Orbital simulation from JPL (Java) / Ephemeris
 Elements and Ephemeris for 22P/Kopff – Minor Planet Center
 22P/Kopff at CometBase
 22P – Gary W. Kronk's Cometography
 22P at Kazuo Kinoshita's Comets
 22P/Kopff / 2009 – Seiichi Yoshida @ aerith.net

Periodic comets
0022
Discoveries by August Kopff
Comets in 2015
19060823